HM Prison Berwyn is a £250 million Category C adult male prison in Wrexham County Borough, Wales. It is the largest prison in the UK, opened in 2017, and is operated by His Majesty's Prison Service.

Name
The gaol's name was announced by then-Governor Russ Trent on 17 February 2016. The name Berwyn comes from the elements of Middle Welsh barr (summit, peak) and gwyn (white). A spokesperson for the National Offender Management Service (NOMS) said that the prison had been named after the Welsh mountain range. The original shortlist of six names was: Bridgeway, Marcher, Cerrig Tân, Dee Vale, Whittlesham and Y Berwyn. These names were suggested by local schools, communities and historical societies.

Structure
The prison is split into three houses, the first, Bala opening in February 2017 and the other two, Alwen and Ceiriog in the autumn.  Each section can hold different communities including one for armed forces veterans.

Operation
It was designed to house 2100 men and to be the cheapest to run Category C prison in the country, with a projected cost of £14,000 per inmate. However as of 2019, it is still incomplete, only 60% full and costs £36,000 per prisoner each year.

Enforced cell sharing
The prison was planned to be at 75% capacity by the end of 2017 but in June 2018, 16 months after opening, the prison was still only half full. It has been suggested that this is due to the contentious design of the prison, which requires a high proportion of prisoners to share cells, to cut costs. Prior to the design of Berwyn, the Prison Service worked on the basis that one person to a cell was the norm.

Controversies

The 'Bala controversy'
In 2017, residents of the town Bala in Gwynedd were angered by the use of their town's name for one of the prison's houses, with a petition being started, to get the name changed. The petition received over 400 signatures.

Suspension of Governor
The first governor, Russ Trent who had also served as project director, was suspended on 21 August 2018 following unspecified allegations. He returned to work after the investigation concluded with no action taken by the Prison Service. Nick Leader assumed the role of Governor in April 2019.

References

Prisons in Wrexham County Borough
2017 establishments in Wales
Berwyn